Maltby is a hamlet in the  East Lindsey district of Lincolnshire, England. It is in the civil parish of Tathwell.

The Knights Templars had a preceptory here, later owned by the Knights Hospitallers.

External links

"Raithby cum Maltby", Genuki.org.uk

Villages in Lincolnshire